Amata cholmlei is a moth of the  subfamily Arctiinae. Described by George Hampson in 1907, it is found in Kenya.

References

 Natural History Museum Lepidoptera generic names catalog

Endemic moths of Kenya
cholmlei
Moths described in 1907
Moths of Africa